Spangereid Church is a parish church of the Church of Norway in Lindesnes Municipality in Agder county, Norway. It is located in the village of Høllen. It is one of the churches for the Lindesnes parish which is part of the Lister og Mandal prosti (deanery) in the Diocese of Agder og Telemark. The white, stone church was built in a Romanesque cruciform design in the year 1140 using plans drawn up by an unknown architect. The church seats about 300 people.

History
The earliest existing historical records of the church date back to the year 1328, but the church construction has been dated to approximately the year 1140. The Romanesque stone church originally had a rectangular nave and a narrower, square chancel. During the 1830s, the western wall of the church was removed and the church was lengthened and small additions were built to the north and south, creating a cruciform design, nearly doubling the size of the church. A tower over the new western entrance was also constructed during this expansion project.

In 1814, this church served as an election church. Together with more than 300 other parish churches across Norway, it was a polling station for elections to the 1814 Norwegian Constituent Assembly which wrote the Constitution of Norway. This was Norway's first national elections. Each church parish was a constituency that elected people called "electors" who later met together in each county to elect the representatives for the assembly that was to meet in Eidsvoll later that year.

Media gallery

See also
List of churches in Agder og Telemark

References

External links
Lindesnes parish website

Lindesnes
Churches in Agder
Stone churches in Norway
Cruciform churches in Norway
12th-century churches in Norway
Churches completed in 1140
12th-century establishments in Norway
Norwegian election church